QuestBridge is a national nonprofit based in Palo Alto, California. Its goal is to connect low-income and first-gen students with partner colleges and universities.

Background
In 1987, Stanford University students Marc Lawrence and Michael McCullough started the Stanford Medical Youth Science Program as an outreach program for eight low-income students from East Palo Alto who were interested in a future in medicine. This program eventually led to the launch of the Quest program in 1994, then called the Stanford Youth Environmental Science Program (SYESP), aimed specifically at Stanford. Although they initially expanded to include Harvard University, this program ended by 2002 as the focus returned to Stanford. By 2004, the program had evolved into QuestBridge. Over the next decade QuestBridge developed partnerships with a number of colleges.

According to the Columbia Daily Spectator in 2021, QuestBridge's goal is to match "high school students with a full-ride offer of admission from one of its 45 partner universities. Targeting students based on data from admissions tests and networks of guidance counselors, QuestBridge aims to reach high-achieving students well before the typical January application deadlines, offering mentoring programs that make the admissions process—which traditionally advantages wealthy students—more accessible for low-income applicants."

Partner colleges
, the National College Match officially has 50 partner colleges, a mix of research universities and liberal arts colleges.

Northeast

Amherst College
Barnard College
Boston College
Boston University
Bowdoin College
Brown University
Colby College
Colgate University
College of the Holy Cross
Columbia University
Dartmouth College
Hamilton College
Haverford College
Massachusetts Institute of Technology
Middlebury College
Princeton University
Smith College
Swarthmore College
Tufts University
University of Pennsylvania
Vassar College
Wellesley College
Wesleyan University
Williams College
Yale University

South

Davidson College
Duke University
Emory University
Johns Hopkins University
Rice University
University of Virginia
Vanderbilt University
Washington and Lee University

Midwest

Carleton College
Case Western Reserve University
Denison University
Grinnell College
Macalester College
Northwestern University
Oberlin College
University of Chicago
University of Notre Dame
Washington University in St. Louis

West

California Institute of Technology
Claremont McKenna College
Colorado College
Pomona College
Scripps College
Stanford University
University of Southern California

References

External links
 

Non-profit organizations based in California
University and college admissions